Vasyanovich is a Russian surname. Notable people with the surname include:

Andrei Vasyanovich (born 1988), Russian footballer
Sergei Vasyanovich (born 1982), Russian footballer

See also 
 Vasya (disambiguation)

Russian-language surnames